Jakin is a city in Early County, Georgia, United States. Incorporated in 1895, Jakin's population was 155 at the 2010 census.

Geography
Jakin is located in southern Early County at  (31.090574, -84.983179). U.S. Route 84 passes through the southern part of the town, leading southeast  to Donalsonville and northwest  to Dothan, Alabama.

Demographics

As of the census of 2000, there were 157 people, 71 households, and 42 families residing in the city. The racial makeup of the city was 70.70% White, 28.03% African American, 1.27% from other races. Hispanic or Latino of any race were 1.27% of the population.

There were 71 households, out of which 23.9% had children under the age of 18 living with them, 43.7% were married couples living together, 12.7% had a female householder with no husband present, and 40.8% were non-families. 36.6% of all households were made up of individuals, and 19.7% had someone living alone who was 65 years of age or older. The average household size was 2.21 and the average family size was 2.90.

In the city, the population was spread out, with 21.0% under the age of 18, 8.3% from 18 to 24, 25.5% from 25 to 44, 27.4% from 45 to 64, and 17.8% who were 65 years of age or older. The median age was 40 years. For every 100 females, there were 93.8 males. For every 100 females age 18 and over, there were 100.0 males.

The median income for a household in the city was $18,750, and the median income for a family was $40,500. Males had a median income of $33,438 versus $14,375 for females. The per capita income for the city was $18,863. About 28.6% of families and 34.5% of the population were below the poverty line, including 44.8% of those under the age of eighteen and 45.0% of those 65 or over.

History
Early County was created by an act of the General Assembly on December 15, 1818. Land lots of  surveyed in 1819 and 1820 were distributed by the state in lotteries. Jakin is in the 26th land district in the southernmost end of the county.

As early as 1817 settlers began moving into the area and began to build on the old Indian paths along the river. These old paths became the Old River Road in 1820 and a post road by the mid 1820s. The post riders were often harassed by Indians. As the forests along the river were cleared, large plantations and fine frame homes began to appear. The Chattahoochee River,  to the west, was the main source of transportation, bearing downstream huge square-cut timbers to Apalachicola, Florida, for ship building and turpentine for export, and bearing cotton upstream to the cotton mills in Columbus. In 1821 the Armstrong and Attaway Company built the first cotton gin at nearby Saffold Navy Yard.

The first families established here were the Allens, Rambos, Donalsons, Harrells, Shewmakes, Saffolds, Johnsons, Hayes, Gibsons, Crawfords, and Moodys. In 1828 a road was made from Blakely to Bainbridge on which settled the Hodges, Warrens, Minters, Easoms and Perrys. These families pioneered what became Jakin.

The first mayor of Jakin, James Morris "Major" Bivings, named the town "Jakin" after one of the columns of Solomon's temple.

In addition to small farm agriculture, Jakin's early economic growth resulted from turpentine. The unspoiled longleaf pine forests were prime resources, first for turpentine then lumber. Bivings and his partner, James W. Duke of Chicago, founded the Duke and Bivings Lumber Company complete with housing, commissary and post office. Bivings served as the first postmaster. On January 3, 1898, the Flowers Company purchased the lumber mill for $20,000. In addition to machines, buildings and materials, the purchase included  of land and a railway. According to published town history, an estimated 1,000 workers were employed by the mill. In 1903 Jakin's population was 2,000. World War I and deforestation led to the closure of the lumber mill in 1918.

Agriculture served as Jakin's main industry until 1963, with Great Northern Nekoosa's purchase of a family-owned lumber mill which later became Great Southern Paper, which also ran a plywood mill in nearby Cedar Springs. Great Southern Paper was acquired by Georgia-Pacific in 1990. In 2005 GP was acquired by the privately held Koch Industries. Despite changing ownership, the mill has operated continuously.

Education
Jakin is served by the Early County School District schools in Blakely: Early County Elementary School, Early County Middle School, and Early County High School.

It was formerly the site of Jakin High School.

Notable person
 Isabelle Daniels Holston, 1956 Olympic bronze medal winner

References

 Centennial History Committee (1995) Jakin Remembers
 Gretchen Geisinger (1999) On Solomon's Porch South Georgia Folklife Project, Valdosta State University

External links
 City of Jakin

Cities in Georgia (U.S. state)
Cities in Early County, Georgia